McCully is a variation of McCulloch, a common surname of Scottish origin.  McCully may refer to the following people:

 Charlie McCully (1947-2007), Scottish-born American soccer player
 Ed McCully (1927-1956), American missionary
 Emily Arnold McCully (born 1939), American author
 Helen McCully (1902–1977), Canadian food writer, critic and cookbook author
 Henry McCully (born 1948), Scottish-born American soccer player
 Jonathan McCully (1809-1877), one of the Fathers of Canadian Confederation, senator and Nova Scotia Supreme Court judge
 Justin McCully (born 1976), American retired professional mixed martial artist and professional wrestler
 Kilmer S. McCully, Chief of Pathology and Laboratory Medicine Services for the United States Department of Veterans Affairs Medical Center
 Laura Elizabeth McCully (1886-1924), Canadian feminist and poet
 Lawrence McCully (1831-1892), a Justice of the Hawaii Supreme Court and Speaker of the Hawaii House of Representatives
 Murray McCully (born 1953), New Zealand politician
 Newton A. McCully (1867-1951), United States Navy vice admiral
 Rachael McCully (born 1982), Australian basketball player
 one of the parties of Frampton v McCully, a New Zealand case